Benny Chan may refer to:

Benny Chan (actor) (born 1969), Hong Kong actor and singer 
Benny Chan (filmmaker) (1961–2020), Hong Kong film director, producer and writer

See also
Ben Chan (born 1975), Hong Kong politician
Benjamin Chan, American biologist